Higton is a surname. Notable people with the surname include:

John Higton (1775–1827), English animal painter
William Higton (1796–1867), English clergyman and philanthropist

See also
Hinton (name)